William John Posedel (August 2, 1906 – November 28, 1989), nicknamed "Barnacle Bill", was an American right-handed pitcher in Major League Baseball who played for the Brooklyn Dodgers and Boston Bees/Braves in 1938–41 and in 1946.

Posedel was born in San Francisco, California. He began his professional baseball career in 1929, pitching for the Portland Beavers of the Pacific Coast League. He would spend all or parts of six seasons pitching for Portland, and twice (in 1936 and 1937) win 20-plus games for the Beavers. Posedel's extended service in the PCL resulted in his late Major League debut, at age 31, for the 1938 Dodgers.

In his finest MLB campaign, 1939 with the Boston "Bees" (then the Braves' official nickname), Posedel won 15 of 28 decisions, including five shutouts, for a seventh-place team that claimed only 63 victories all season. All told, Posedel allowed 747 hits and 248 bases on balls in 679 innings of work in the Majors. He struck out 227.

After his playing career, Posedel was a pitching coach for the Pittsburgh Pirates (1949–53), St. Louis Cardinals (1954–57), Philadelphia Phillies (1958), San Francisco Giants (1959–60), Oakland Athletics (1968–72) and San Diego Padres (1974). He also worked as a scout for the Pirates (1948), Cleveland Indians (1961) and Kansas City Athletics (1962–67), and managed the 1957 Beavers from April 29 through the end of the season.

Posedel served in the United States Navy from 1925 to 1929 and again during World War II, from 1942 to 1945. He died in Livermore, California, at age 83.

See also

 List of St. Louis Cardinals coaches

References

External links

1906 births
1989 deaths
Baseball players from San Francisco
Boston Bees players
Boston Braves players
Brooklyn Dodgers players
Cleveland Indians scouts
Kansas City Athletics scouts
Major League Baseball pitchers
Major League Baseball pitching coaches
Oakland Athletics coaches
Philadelphia Phillies coaches
Pittsburgh Pirates coaches
Pittsburgh Pirates scouts
Portland Beavers managers
Portland Beavers players
Pueblo Braves players
St. Louis Cardinals coaches
San Diego Padres coaches
San Francisco Giants coaches
Seattle Rainiers players
Tulsa Oilers (baseball) players
United States Navy personnel of World War II
United States Navy sailors